Sydney Brown (born March 21, 2000) is an American football safety for the Illinois Fighting Illini. He is the identical twin brother of Chase Brown.

Early life and high school career
Brown originally attended the London South Collegiate Institute in London, Ontario, Canada before transferring to Saint Stephen's Episcopal School in Bradenton, Florida in 2016, along with his twin brother, Chase Brown. Over his junior and senior seasons, he combined to have 132 tackles and three interceptions. He committed to the University of Illinois Urbana-Champaign to play college football.

College career
As a true freshman at Illinois in 2018, Brown started all 10 games he played in and had 55 tackles and one interceptions. In 2019, his brother, Chase joined Illinois after a year at Western Michigan. That season, he started 10 of 11 games, recording 88 tackles, three interceptions and an interception returned for a touchdown. He started all six games in the Covid-19 shortened 2020 season, finishing with 36 tackles. In 2021, Brown started all 12 games, and had 81 tackles and one sack. He returned to Illinois for his senior year in 2022.

Personal life
Brown is the identical twin brother of running back Chase Brown. The two were teammates at Illinois.

References

External links
Illinois Fighting Illini bio

2000 births
American football safeties
American identical twins
Black Canadian players of American football
Canadian expatriate American football people in the United States
Canadian players of American football
Illinois Fighting Illini football players
Living people
Sportspeople from London, Ontario